Roman Alexander González (born September 6, 1996) is an American professional baseball infielder for the Chicago White Sox of Major League Baseball (MLB).

Career
González attended American Senior High School. He enrolled at the University of Miami, and played college baseball for the Miami Hurricanes. In 2017, he played collegiate summer baseball with the Orleans Firebirds of the Cape Cod Baseball League, and was named a league all-star.

The White Sox selected González in the 18th round, with the 528th selection, of the 2018 MLB draft, In 2018 with the Great Falls Voyagers he batted .254 with 10 home runs and 33 runs batted in (RBIs) in 54 games. In 2019, he went to the Kannapolis Intimidators. In 101 games, he batted .244 with four home runs and 45 RBIs. In 2021, he played for both the Birmingham Barons and Charlotte Knights. In 87 games combined, he batted .275 with 23 home runs and 57 RBIs with 22 stolen bases while being caught only six times.

On September 1, 2021, González was promoted to the major leagues. He made his MLB debut on September 3 as a pinch hitter, going 0-for-2 against the Kansas City Royals. On September 8, he got his first hit, a pinch-hit single off Oakland Athletics pitcher Andrew Chafin.

References

External links

Living people
1996 births
American people of Cuban descent
Baseball players from Miami
Major League Baseball infielders
Chicago White Sox players
Miami Hurricanes baseball players
Orleans Firebirds players
Great Falls Voyagers players
Kannapolis Intimidators players
Birmingham Barons players
Charlotte Knights players
American Senior High School (Miami-Dade County, Florida) alumni